β-amyrin synthase (2,3-oxidosqualene beta-amyrin cyclase, AsbAS1, BPY, EtAS, GgbAS1, LjAMY1, MtAMY1, PNY, BgbAS) is an enzyme with systematic name (3S)-2,3-epoxy-2,3-dihydrosqualene mutase (cyclizing, beta-amyrin-forming). This enzyme catalyses the following chemical reaction

 (3S)-2,3-epoxy-2,3-dihydrosqualene  beta-amyrin

Some organism possess a monofunctional beta-amyrin synthase.

References

External links 
 

EC 5.4.99